Robert Frye may refer to:

Robert Frye (MP for New Shoreham), 1385-1399, MP for New Shoreham
Robert Frye (died 1435), MP for Shaftesbury and Wilton

See also
Robert Fry (disambiguation)